The Greed of William Hart is a 1948 British horror film directed by Oswald Mitchell and starring Tod Slaughter, Henry Oscar, Aubrey Woods, Patrick Addison, Jenny Lynn (star Tod Slaughter's real life wife), Winifred Melville and Arnold Bell. The film depicts two Edinburgh bodysnatchers closely modeled on the real Burke and Hare.

Plot

In 1828 Edinburgh, Scotland, two Irish immigrants, Mr. Hart (Tod Slaughter) and Mr. Moore (Henry Oscar), take up murdering the locals and selling their bodies to the local medical school, which needs fresh bodies for anatomy lectures and demonstrations. When a young woman, Mary Patterson, goes missing, recently qualified medic Hugh Alston (Patrick Addison), just returned from his first voyage as a ship's doctor, is alerted by Daft Jamie and Janet that Mary has been taken by a man to Gibb's Close. Jamie says the resurrectionists live there.

Alston suspects the Hart and Moore are involved in foul play, but the arrogant, amoral Dr. Cox (Arnold Bell) – the main buyer for the bodies – attempts to hinder his investigation. Meanwhile, the murderous duo set their sights on eccentric local boy "Daft Jamie" (Aubrey Woods) and an old woman.

Cast
 Tod Slaughter – William Hart
 Henry Oscar – Mr Moore
 Jenny Lynn – Helen Moore
 Winifred Melville – Meg Hart
 Aubrey Woods – Daft Jamie Wilson
 Patrick Addison – Hugh Alston
 Arnold Bell – Dr. Cox
 Mary Love – Mary Patterson
 Ann Trego – Janet Brown
 Edward Malin – David Patterson
 Hubert Woodward – Innkeeper Swanson
 Dennis Wyndham – Sergeant Fisher

NB:  Although playing Henry Oscar's character's wife in this film, in real life Jenny Lynn was married to Tod Slaughter.

Production

The film was originally made as a fairly direct historical adaptation of the Burke and Hare murders. The British Board of Film Censors, however, insisted that all references to the real-life murderers be removed. The film was then re-titled and re-dubbed with different character names, substituting "Hart" and "Moore" for Hare and Burke, respectively, and "Dr. Cox" for Dr. Knox. All other names, including victims Mary Patterson, Mrs. Docherty, and "Daft Jamie" Wilson, remain unchanged.

Writer John Gilling would go on to script another version of the same story in 1960, titled The Flesh and the Fiends. This version used the correct names for the killers.

The film was made at Bushey Studios.

Distribution
The film was distributed in the United States by J.H. Hoffberg Productions in 1953, slightly edited, as Horror Maniacs.

See also
 The Flesh and the Fiends (1960)
 Burke & Hare (1971)
 The Doctor and the Devils (1985)
 Burke & Hare (Comedy, 2010)

References

Bibliography
 Richards, Jeffrey (ed.) The Unknown 1930s: An Alternative History of the British Cinema, 1929-1939. I.B. Tauris, 1998.

External links
 

1948 films
1948 crime films
British serial killer films
Films directed by Oswald Mitchell
Biographical films about serial killers
Films set in the 1820s
Films set in Edinburgh
British black-and-white films
Bushey Studios films
Cultural depictions of William Burke and Hare
British crime films
1940s serial killer films
1940s English-language films
1940s British films